Chrissie Chau Sau-na (born 22 May 1985) is a Hong Kong actress and model. Chau achieved widespread fame after the release of her gravure photo albums in 2009 and 2010. Her film career began after she starred in the horror film Womb Ghosts (2009); Chau has starred in 20 productions in Hong Kong, China, Taiwan and Malaysia.

Chau won four "Most Searched Photos on Yahoo!" in 2009–2012, "Yahoo! Entertainment Spotlight Person" in 2009 and "Most Popular Actress Award" in Yahoo Asia Buzz Awards. She received "Award of Merit: Leading Actress" from The Accolade Competition in 2011 for her performance in Beach Spike.

Chau first drew attention following "After 90s' Girls" in Hong Kong from the survey held by YMCA 2010. The report showed surveyed girls think that Chau has a high IQ and is optimistic and bold, whilst Chau ranked 16th in 2010 LIVAC Celebrity Roasters of Cross-Straits Media announced by HKIEd, a title for which she has received substantial media attention.

Life and career
Chau emigrated from Chaozhou to Hong Kong with her family when she was 10. She states that she worked in a fast-food restaurant when she was 15, and then as a shop assistant in Causeway Bay earning HK$3,000 (about US$380) a month.

Chau is Hong Kong's most famous pseudo-model, or lang mo, She began pseudo-modelling after she won the runner-up title in the 2002 Comics Festival 'Game Girl'. She rose to prominence as the poster girl for Slim Beauty slimming boutique. In a TV commercial for the boutique, Chau rips off her clothes, revealing a bikini underneath, to 'stop the traffic' while she crosses the road in the business district of Central. In 2009, she released a limited edition life-sized poster with her likeness– dressed in lingerie– printed on the cover, at HK$560 (about US$72) apiece.

Chrissie Chau was invited as a guest for a talk show at Hong Kong University of Science and Technology in late 2009, as part of a seminar series entitled "Knowledge Unlimited", aimed at widening students' horizons. Chau was invited as a guest to the seminar to discuss "Unscrambling the Chrissie Chau Phenomenon". Chau was interviewed by Professor Li Siu-leung of Lingnan University in front of an audience of 400 students. She was asked a number of philosophical and existential questions, and was criticised for not being able to answer them; The Standard described this as "an old-fashioned ambush". The university was in turn criticised by radio host Eileen Cha for choosing Chau for a seminar series entitled Knowledge Unlimited.

In 2010, veteran Hong Kong actor Anthony Wong openly criticised and ridiculed pseudo-models, specifically Chrissie Chau, several times, calling them brainless and "bimbos". The related controversy led to pseudo-models being banned from a book-fair.

Filmography

Film

Television

Music Videos

Awards and nominations

References

External links

 Chrissie Chau's Official Mini Blog (sina)
 Chrissie Chau on Hong Kong Movie Database

1985 births
Living people
Hong Kong female models
Hong Kong film actresses
Hong Kong television actresses
People from Chaozhou
Actresses from Guangdong
21st-century Hong Kong actresses
Chinese film actresses
Chinese television actresses
21st-century Chinese actresses